Split Personality is the debut studio album by American rapper Cassidy. It was released on March 16, 2004, by Full Surface, with manufacturing and distribution from J. The album debuted at number 2 on the US Billboard 200, selling 118,000 copies in its first week. To date, the album was certified gold by the Recording Industry Association of America (RIAA) for the shipments of 500,000 copies in the United States.

Background and recording
Recording sessions for the album began in 2003. The album was broken down into three parts. The first part of the record (credited as "Cassidy") was more pop and radio friendly, with records such as "Get No Better" and the R. Kelly assisted lead single "Hotel". The second part of the record (credited as "The Problem") was targeted directly towards Cassidy's fans, who began to support him following his appearances on various mixtapes, with songs such as "Blood Pressure" and "The Problem". The third and final part of the record (credited to "B. Reese") was more introspective and aimed towards his fans who have supported him since his early days of his rap career with "Husslin'" and "Real Talk".

Singles
The album's lead single, "Hotel" featuring American R&B singer-songwriter R. Kelly, was created during recording sessions at Kelly's Chicago studio "The Chocolate Factory". R. Kelly also appears on the official remix to "Hotel", with guest vocals from American rapper Trina. The song was a hit and reached the top ten on the US Billboard Hot 100, as of February 2004. The song was also nominated for a Vibe Award for the "Coolest Collabo" in 2004. The album's second single, "Get No Better", features guest appearances from then label-mate Contemporary R&B singer Mashonda, as well as vocals from label owner and mentor Swizz Beatz. While the song did not do as well on the singles charts as "Hotel", it did reach number 82 on the US Billboard Hot 100. It was followed up by a music video, which features Vida Guerra as the lead female. songs "Take It" and "Make You Scream Pt.2" were also recorded during the Split Personality sessions but were eventually scrapped and later used only as official promotional singles from the album.

Critical response

AllMusic described the album as "a minor disappointment while simultaneously showing promise". Its review considered the first third of the album as the disappointing section and the best tracks to be "Hotel", "Can I Talk to You" and "Real Talk".

Track listing 
Credits adapted from the album's liner notes.

Sample credits
"Hotel" contains a replayed elements from "Rapper's Delight", written and performed by Bernard Edwards and Nile Rodgers.
"Make U Scream" contains excerpts from "What's a Telephone Bill?", written by William Earl Collins, Gary Lee Cooper, and George Clinton, Jr., as performed by Bootsy's Rubber Band.
"Tha Problem" contains excerpts from "Terminator X to the Edge of Panic", written by Norman Rogers, William Drayton, and Carl Ridenhour, as performed by Public Enemy.
"Real Talk" contains excerpts from "Back Against The Wall", written and performed by Curtis Mayfield.
"Husslin'" contains excerpts from "Aquarius", written by Galt MacDermot, James Rado, and Gerome Ragni, as performed by Honey Cone.
"I'm Hungry" contains excerpts from "Public Enemy #1", written by Carl Ridenhour and Hank Shocklee, as performed by Public Enemy.
"Around Tha World" contains excerpts from "We've Got a Good Thing Going", written by Berry Gordy, Alphonso Mizell, Dennis Lussier, and Frederick Perren, as performed by Michael Jackson.

Chart positions

Weekly charts

Year-end charts

References

2004 debut albums
Cassidy (rapper) albums
Full Surface Records albums
J Records albums
Albums produced by Swizz Beatz
Ruff Ryders Entertainment albums